Aed Ua Cellaigh, 38th King of Uí Maine and 5th Chief of the Name, d. 1134.

Background

Aed is one of a number of 11th-century kings of Uí Maine who is obscure. According to John O'Donovan, this seems to have been as a result both of historical confusion, and possibly genealogical re-ramification, where the pedigree of one branch of the Uí Maine was later treated as a king-list.

His place in the genealogical tree is uncertain, which reflects the tumult in the kingdom, following the long reigns of Tadhg Mór Ua Cellaigh (986-1014) and his son, Concobar mac Tadg Ua Cellaig (1014-1030). He is called Aed mac maic Taidhg h-Úi Cellaig but it is unclear which Taidhg is meant.

The state of Uí Maine

By the 1130s, the kingdom was a vassal state of Tairrdelbach Ua Conchobair, King of Connacht.

One of the few, albeit indirect, references to the kingdom during Aed's reign was the battle of Caill Cobhtaigh in 1131:

The battle of Caill-Cobhthaigh was gained over the Sil-Muireadhaigh by the people of Upper Connaught, the former having come on a predatory excursion into Munster; and both parties having engaged through mistake, the Sil-Muireadhaigh left their spoils behind.

Upper Connacht in this sense means south Connacht, which comprised almost the entire of Uí Maine. A great slaughter of the O’ Conchoobair’s was made here by the O’ Cellaigh’s and again in 1135.

Warfare in 1132

In 1132, Máenmaige, the westernmost section of the kingdom, was "plundered by Conchobhar ua Briain, who carried off many cows." He may have attended the conference of Abhall Chethernaigh in his capacity as a vassal, where "Toirdhealbhach Ua Conchobhair and Conchobhar Ua Briain, with the chiefs of the clergy of Connaught and Munster ... [made] a year's peace was made between them."

Aed died the same year died Muireadhach ua Flaithbheartach, King of Maigh Seóla. It is unknown if there were any connection between the two deaths - Muireadhach's kingdom bordered Maenmaige -, if as a result of ua Briain's attack, a succession dispute, or by other means.

References

 The Tribes and customs of Hy-Many, commonly called O'Kelly's country, John O'Donovan, 1843.
 Annals of Ulster at CELT: Corpus of Electronic Texts at University College Cork
 Annals of Tigernach at CELT: Corpus of Electronic Texts at University College Cork
Revised edition of McCarthy's synchronisms at Trinity College Dublin.

People from County Galway
People from County Roscommon
Aed
12th-century Irish monarchs
Kings of Uí Maine